HMS Hunter was one of three s built for the Royal Navy in the 1890s. Completed in 1896 she spent her career in home waters and was sold for scrap in 1912.

Description
Ordered as part of the 1893–1894 Naval Programme, the Hardy-class torpedo boat destroyers were Fairfield Shipbuilding and Engineering Company's first such ships. They were powered by a pair of triple-expansion steam engines, each driving a single propeller shaft using steam provided by four Thornycroft water-tube boilers.

The ships were armed with a single quick-firing (QF) 12-pounder (3 in (76 mm) Mk I gun and five QF 6-pounder Mk I Hotchkiss guns in single mounts. Their torpedo armament consisted of two rotating torpedo tubes for 18-inch (450 mm) torpedoes, one mount amidships and the other on the stern.

Construction and career
Hunter was laid down by Fairfield at its Govan shipyard on 7 June 1894, launched on 28 December 1895 and completed in May 1896. In 1896 Hunter was in reserve at Portsmouth. Her crew was transferred to Hunter during repairs.

She took part in the fleet review held at Spithead on 16 August 1902 for the coronation of King Edward VII. The ship was sold for scrap in 1912.

Notes

Bibliography

Ships built in Govan
Handy-class destroyers
1895 ships